Avisaurus (meaning "bird lizard") is a genus of enantiornithine bird from the Late Cretaceous of North America.

Discovery
Avisaurus archibaldi was discovered in the Late Cretaceous Hell Creek Formation of North America (Maastrichtian, from c.70.6-66 million years ago), making it one of the last enantiornithids. It was collected in 1975 in the UCMP locality V73097, in Garfield County, Montana, USA. The holotype is represented by a single fossil of a tarsometatarsus in the collection of the University of California Museum of Paleontology. It has the catalog number UCMP 117600. The species name honors J. David Archibald, its discoverer, from The University of California, Berkeley. It was initially described as the left tarsometatarsus of a non-avian theropod by Brett-Surman and Paul in 1985. It was later redescribed as the right tarsometatarsus of an enantiornithine bird by Chiappe in 1992.

Avisaurus gloriae Varricchio and Chiappe 1995, discovered in the late Campanian Upper Two Medicine Formation of Glacier County, Montana, USA, was renamed Gettyia by Atterholt et al. (2018).

Description

RAM 14306, an incomplete coracoid, is bigger than the holotype.

Classification
This genus belongs to the enantiornithine family Avisauridae, which also contains similar animals from South America such as Soroavisaurus  and Neuquenornis  In the Late Cretaceous the Americas were still separated by a branch of the Tethys Ocean.

The paper by Brett-Surman and Paul in 1985 explicitly considered the possibility that A. archibaldi was an enantiornithine. The authors described and named UCMP 117600 formally, but they looked at other enantiornithine material, including the "metatarsus" PVL 4690 from Argentina. The authors assigned this latter fossil to Avisaurus sp. From this they concluded that members of the genus Avisaurus existed in both North and South America in the Late Cretaceous. Moreover, the authors concluded that the length/width ratio and degree of metacarpal fusion of these bones were more like those of non — avian dinosaurs. A terrestrial dinosaur genus in both continents would then support Brett — Surman's theory that there had been a land connection between the two continents.

Further discoveries and further study by Chiappe showed that all of the material belonged to enantiornithine birds, and PVL 4690 was given its own genus Soroavisaurus.

Paleoenvironment

Avisaurus is known from the humid low-lying swamps, lakes, and river basins of the western shore of the Western Interior Seaway, Hell Creek Formation, and from the much more arid uplands between that area and the Cordilleran Overthrust Belt which eventually formed the Rocky Mountains.

In those flooded coastal wooded plains with predominantly coniferous trees and flowering bush Avisaurus were hunting. A strong tarsus of Avisaurus with inwardly curved claws resembles that of eudromaeosaurs. With these claws, they could grab and hold prey, presumably having a resemblance to modern raptors.

References

Further reading
 Brett-Surman, Michael K. & Paul, Gregory S. (1985): A new family of bird-like dinosaurs linking Laurasia and Gondwanaland. J. Vertebr. Paleontol. 5(2): 133–138.
 Cambra-Moo, Oscar; Delgado Buscalioni, Ángela; Cubo, Jorge; Castanet, Jacques; Loth, Marie-Madeleine; de Margerie, Emmanuel & de Ricqlès, Armand (2006): Histological observations of Enantiornithine bone (Saurischia, Aves) from the Lower Cretaceous of Las Hoyas (Spain). C. R. Palevol 5(5): 685–691.  PDF fulltext
 Chiappe, Luis M. (1993): Enantiornithine (Aves) Tarsometatarsi from the Cretaceous Lecho Formation of Northwestern Argentina. American Museum Novitates 3083: 1-27. [English with Spanish abstract] PDF fulltext

Avisaurids
Bird genera
Maastrichtian life
Cretaceous birds of North America
Prehistoric birds of North America
Late Cretaceous dinosaurs of North America
Hell Creek fauna
Fossil taxa described in 1985
Taxa named by Gregory S. Paul